Aims Community College is a public community college serving northern Colorado with locations in Greeley, Windsor, Fort Lupton, and Loveland. Aims has more than 200 degree and certificate programs and provides day and night classes. Aims was founded in Greeley in 1967 and graduated its first class in 1969. The school established a second campus in Fort Lupton in 1984, and a third in Loveland in 1987. The Aims Automotive and Technology Center, located in Windsor, opened in January 2010.

History

Early history 
In 1965, Kirby Hart of Greeley suggested that a two-year college should be considered for Northern Colorado. On January 24, 1967, the voters in 11 of Weld County’s 12 public school districts approved creation of the Community College District.

Ed Beaty was named the first president of Aims Community College. On September 27, 1967 the first day of classes began in Greeley with 949 students enrolled. In May 1968, the first class graduated and three students received degrees. In 1969, a permanent  site for the college was purchased on the western edge of Greeley along what is now 20th Street and 47th Avenue.

Upon Beaty's death in 1975, Richard A. Laughlin was appointed acting president of Aims Community College. In May 1976, Laughlin was permanently named the second president. In December 1976, the physical education center was opened on the Greeley campus. Upon Laughlin's exit from the role of Aims president in February 1979, Jerry A. Kiefer was named acting president.

In August 1979, George R. Conger was appointed Aims Community College's president. In 1984, the south campus opened west of Fort Lupton. In 1987, Aims opened a campus in downtown Loveland. In April 1992, Aims celebrated its 25th anniversary. Conger retired in October 1997 after 18 years in the role of Aims president. Jerry A. Kiefer was named acting president.

August 31, 2004, was the first day of the semester system, replacing the quarter system. In August 2019, Aims opened a new flight hangar at the Northern Colorado Regional Airport, closing its flight hangar at the Greeley-Weld County Airport.

Campuses

Aims currently has four physical campuses. It also offers online courses, which the school refers to as its "online campus".

Greeley
The Greeley campus is the largest campus, with 70 percent of Aims' students taking classes there each year. The campus is located in west Greeley and has 11 buildings.

Fort Lupton
The Aims Fort Lupton campus is located east of downtown Fort Lupton. The campus houses Aims' Agricultural Sciences and Technology Department, which offers transfer degrees to Colorado State University in Soil and Crop Science, Agriculture Business, Horticulture and Animal Science. The program also offers two-year A.A.S. degrees in Agribusiness, Production Agriculture and Animal Science, along with one-year certificates in Precision Agriculture, Agribusiness Management, Production Agriculture Mechanics, Production Agriculture and Crops and Animal Science.

Loveland
The Aims Loveland campus is located in downtown Loveland.

Windsor
The Aims Automotive & Technology Center is a 45,000-square-foot technology and education center located near I-25 and US-34. Its location was chosen to offer convenient drive times from the major population areas of northern Colorado.

The Automotive & Technology Center offers automotive programs and academic classes. The facility includes classrooms, computer labs, a science lab and conference rooms.

Automotive Service Technology, Collision Repair and Refinishing, Light Diesel Repair and Upholstery classes are offered at the Center. The programs are nationally recognized and certified in both secondary and post-secondary educational systems with accreditation provided by the National Automotive Technicians and Education Foundation (NATEF).

The 10-acre Public Safety Institute (PSI) opened in January 2016 adjacent to the Automotive & Technology Center. PSI houses Emergency Medical Services (EMS), Fire Science, Medical Assisting, Phlebotomy and Criminal Justice (CJ). Amenities include a 53,000 square-foot, two-story building; drill ground area for fire, police and EMS training; training tower; science lab; classrooms; computer rooms; CPAT (Candidate Physical Ability Test) testing; simulation rooms for paramedic and EMT training workout room for physical fitness training; medical assistant lab with exam rooms; and locker rooms. PSI also offers general education courses. The facility also houses a sand table used for fire modeling and planning. It also has an Anatomage table, a virtual 4D cadaver resembling an operating table that has the ability to load data from real-life patient or cadaver x-rays, MRI scans and nuclear scans.

Northern Colorado Regional Airport Flight Hangar 
The Aims Flight Training Center (AFTC) relocated in August 2019 from Greeley Airport (KGXY) to a two-hangar building at KFNL (Northern Colorado Regional Airport). The flight program consists primarily of Piper Archers, all of which are equipped with Garmin electronic flight displays (G1000, "glass cockpits"). The fleet also includes two Piper Seminoles and one Super Decathlon. Also on-site in the AFTC are flight simulators and a briefing room for students, complete with phones and computers to retrieve weather briefings.

Accreditation
Aims Community College is accredited by the Higher Learning Commission. Various programs at Aims also have their own accreditations.

 Associate Degree Nursing Program - Colorado State Board of Nursing (SBON) and Accreditation Commission for Education in Nursing (ACEN)
 Nurse Aide Program - Colorado State Board of Nursing (SBON)
 Med Prep Nurse Aide Program: Career Academy - Colorado State Board of Nursing (CBON) 
 Automotive Service Program - NATEF (National Automotive Technicians Education Foundation) certified
 EMS-Paramedic - Commission on Accreditation of Allied Health Education Programs (CAAHEP)
 Surgical Technology - Commission on Accreditation of Allied Health Education Programs (CAAHEP) 
 Police (Peace Officers) Academy - Colorado Peace Officers Standards and Training Board 
 Fire Science - International Fire Service Accreditation Congress Degree Assembly
 Aviation (Fixed Wing) - Federal Aviation Administration (FAA), approved under Part 141
 Air Traffic Controller - FAA Air Traffic Collegiate Training Initiative (AT-CTI)
 Early Childhood Program - National Association for the Education of Young Children (NAEYC)

Media
Aims publishes the Aims Daily and Aims Weekly e-newsletters to faculty, staff and students. 

Aims Communication Media students may also work in a radio broadcast facility on the Greeley campus. The station operates on 89.5 MHz FM.

UNC and CSU connections
Aims Community College students enrolled for 12 or more semester credits are eligible to enroll in one additional undergraduate class (maximum 5 semester credits) at the University of Northern Colorado (UNC) or Colorado State University (CSU) during the corresponding term without additional tuition charges.

In 2019, Aims and UNC announced their partnership called Aims2UNC, which is a concurrent enrollment program between the two schools where students start at Aims Community College and transfer to UNC.

Full-time UNC and CSU students may likewise enroll in one course (maximum 5 semester credits) at Aims. Continuing Education courses cannot be taken as the free class.

References

External links
Official website

Colorado Community College System
Education in Larimer County, Colorado
Education in Weld County, Colorado
Educational institutions established in 1967
1967 establishments in Colorado